The 112th Aviation Regiment is an aviation regiment of the U.S. Army.

Structure
 1st Battalion (Security & Support)
 Headquarters and Headquarters Company
 Company A at Army Aviation Support Facility #1, Bismarck Municipal Airport (ND ARNG).
 Company B at Grand Ledge (MI ARNG).
 Detachment 2 at Army Aviation Support Facility, South Valley Regional Airport, (UT ARNG).
 Company D (UH-72A) at Army Aviation Support Facility #2, Fargo Air National Guard Base, (ND ARNG).
 Detachment 1 (Idaho Army National Guard).
 Detachment 2 (Wisconsin Army National Guard).
 Company H at Army Aviation Support Facility #1, Bismarck Municipal Airport (ND ARNG).

The regiment also includes Detachment 1, Company C, from the OR ARNG

References

112
Aviation